Xylomya americana is a species of fly in the family Xylomyidae.

Distribution
Canada,  United States, Mexico.

References

Xylomyidae
Insects described in 1821
Taxa named by Christian Rudolph Wilhelm Wiedemann
Diptera of North America